The 1911 Census of Ireland was the last census that covered the whole island of Ireland. Censuses were taken at ten-year intervals from 1821 onwards, but the 1921 census was cancelled due to the Irish War of Independence.

The original records of the 1821 to 1851 censuses were destroyed by fire at the Four Courts in Dublin during the Irish Civil War, while those between 1861 and 1891 were possibly pulped during the First World War. All that remained were the 1901 and 1911 census, with the latter put online in 2009 by the National Archives of Ireland.

Information collected

The census information was recorded on the following forms:
Form A, which was completed by the head of the family
Forms B1, B2, and N, which were completed by the census enumerator

Head of the family
Form A, which was completed by the head of the family, contained the following information for each person in the home on the night of 2 April:

Name and Surname
Relation to Head of Family
Religious Profession (Protestants were requested to indicate denomination)
Education (whether able to read and write)
Age (last birthday) and Sex
Rank, Profession, or Occupation
Particulars as to Marriage (marital status, length of marriage, number of children born alive, number of children still living)
Where Born
Irish Language (whether able to speak Irish)
Disability: if persons were:
 Deaf and Dumb
Dumb only
Blind
Imbecile or Idiot (i.e. intellectually disabled)
Lunatic (i.e. severely mentally ill)
The form was signed by both the census enumerator and the head of the family.

Census enumerator
Form B1, which was known as the House and Building Return, was completed by the enumerator and summarised the following administrative information for the street or townland, or part thereof:
County
Parliamentary Division
Poor Law Union
District electoral division
Townland
Parliamentary borough
City
Urban District
Town or Village
Street
Barony
Parish
It then summarised the following information pertaining to the houses and families of the street or townland. The information about houses included:
Number of House or Building
Whether Built or Building
Whether Private Dwelling, Public Building, School, Manufactory, Hotel, Public-house, Lodging-house, Shop, etc.
Number of Out-Offices and Farm-steadings as returned on Form B2
Whether House Inhabited
Walls (whether made of permanent or perishable material)
Roof (whether made of permanent or perishable material)
Rooms (number, whether 1, 2–4, 5–6, 7–9, 10–12, 13+)
Windows in Front (exact number)
Class of House (1st, 2nd, 3rd, or 4th, based on information supplied above)
The information about families included:
Number of distinct Families in each House
Name of the Head of each Family residing in the House
Number of Rooms occupied by each Family
Total Number of Persons in each Family
Date on which Form A was collected
Number of Persons in each Family who were sick on 2 April 1911
Name of the Landholder (if any) on whose Holding the House is situated
Number on Form M1 if House is on the Holding of a Landholder

Form B2, the Return of Outhouses and Farm-Steadings, gave more detailed information on secondary buildings attached to a property, such as outhouses, workshops, and various kinds of farm buildings.

Form N, the Enumerator's Abstract for a Townland or Street, recorded the enumerator's name, the same administrative information as listed for Form B1, the properties and which were inhabited, and the numbers of families, males, and females, and persons of each religious denomination.

Population

Total
The total population of Ireland according to the 1911 census was 4,390,219 of whom 2,192,048 were male and 2,198,171 were female.

By province

By county

*Note: The County Borough of Belfast, established in 1888, straddled the border between Down and Antrim. The River Lagan was the traditional boundary of the two counties. The borough of Belfast had 15 wards, three of which - Ormeau, Pottinger and Victoria - were south of the Lagan and have been included as part of County Down's population. The remainder have been added to County Antrim's population.

Cities

Religion
According to the 1911 census, religious profession broke down as follows:

Viewing the returns
The census returns of 1911 for all 32 counties are available online. The website is freely accessible, with no charge for viewing any of the material.

The original manuscripts of the Census of Ireland are all housed in the National Archives of Ireland. The returns are arranged by townland for rural areas and by street in cities, and it is necessary to know the townland or street where a person lived and its corresponding district electoral division to find the record of a particular person of interest.

The Family History Library also holds microfilm copies of the original 1911 census returns and these can be viewed at the Library in Salt Lake City, Utah. 
A list of Royal Irish Constabulary police barracks, for which the Form H Barrack Returns can be identified, is available at the free to use Royal Irish Constabulary Research Forum.

See also
Census in the United Kingdom
List of United Kingdom censuses
Irish Population Analysis

References

External links
Household returns for 1901/1911, National Archives of Ireland
Statistical returns for the Province of Ulster
Statistical returns for the Province of Munster
Statistical returns for the Province of Leinster
Statistical returns for the Province of Connaught

Demographics of Ireland
Geographic history of Ireland
1911 in Ireland
1911
Ireland